Year 1102 (MCII) was a common year starting on Wednesday (link will display the full calendar) of the Julian calendar.

Events 
 By place 

 Levant 
 Spring – A Fatimid expeditionary force (some 20,000 men) invades Palestine and launches attacks into the Kingdom of Jerusalem. The Crusaders defeat a Fatimid rearguard near Ascalon, and capture the city after a 3-year siege. The Crusaders capture Caesarea Maritima with support of the Genoese fleet. A number of Genoese trading colonies are established along the Mediterranean coast.
 Siege of Tripoli: The Crusaders under Raymond IV (Saint-Gilles) begin the siege of Tripoli (modern Lebanon). The garrison calls for assistance, but a Seljuk relief army from Damascus and Homs is defeated by Raymond.
 May 17 – Battle of Ramla: The Crusaders (500 knights) under King Baldwin I are defeated by the Fatimid army at Ramla (modern Israel). Baldwin and his companions escape through the enemy lines to Arsuf.
 May 27 – The Crusaders under Baldwin I break their way out of Jaffa, which is encircled by the Fatimid Army. A charge of the French cavalry breaks the enemy's ranks, and forces them to retreat to Ascalon.
 Raymond IV is imprisoned by Tancred, nephew of Bohemond I, and regent of the Principality of Antioch (he is later released after promising to demand any claims).
 Dagobert of Pisa (or Daimbert) is briefly deposed as Patriarch of Jerusalem (he is restored later in the year).
 The Venetians establish a new trade emporium in Sidon (modern Lebanon).

 Europe 
 May 5 – The short-lived principality created by Rodrigo Diaz de Vivar (El Cid) ends: Valencia is captured by Almoravid forces under Sultan Yusuf ibn Tashfin. It is later recaptured, evacuated and burned by King Alfonso VI.
 June 4 – Władysław I Herman, duke of Poland, dies at Płock (possibly poisoned by his enemies) after a 23-year reign. He leaves the succession to be disputed between his sons Zbigniew and Bolesław III Wrymouth. 
 The Pacta Conventa formed by the Croatian nobility, recognize King Coloman (the Learned) as their overlord, initiating the personal union between the two kingdoms. Coloman is crowned king of Croatia (until 1116).

 England 
 King Henry I captures Arundel Castle after having besieged Earl Robert of Bellême. Robert loses his English lands (as did his brothers Roger the Poitevin and Arnulf de Montgomery) and is banished to Normandy.

 By topic 

 Religion 
 Council of London: A church council convened by Anselm, archbishop of Canterbury, bans sodomy and the sale of Christian slaves to non-Christian countries, and reforms the clergy.
 Henry I orders the tomb of Edward the Confessor be opened; the body of the former king is supposedly found undecayed. The Westminster monks start to claim Edward as a saint.

Births 
 February 7 – Matilda, Holy Roman Empress (d. 1167)
 October 25 – William Clito, count of Flanders (d. 1128)
 Chekawa Yeshe Dorje, Tibetan Buddhist monk (d. 1176)
 Eleanor of Champagne, French noblewoman (d. 1147)
 Gilla na Naemh Ua Duinn, Irish poet and writer (d. 1160)
 Henry II, margrave of the Northern March (d. 1128)
 Klængur Þorsteinsson, bishop of Skálholt (d. 1176)
 Liang Hongyu (Red Jade), Chinese general (d. 1135)
 Nerses IV (the Gracious), Catholicos of Armenia (d. 1173) 
 Peter of Tarentaise, French abbot and bishop (d. 1174)
 Roger de Beaumont, 2nd Earl of Warwick (d. 1153)
 Zhu, Chinese empress of the Song Dynasty (d. 1127)

Deaths 
 April 9 – Raoul II, Norman nobleman (House of Tosny)
 May 19 – Stephen II, French nobleman and crusader
 June 4 – Władysław I Herman, duke of Poland
 July 29 – Albert III, count of Namur (House of Namur)
 November 1 – Anna Dalassena, Byzantine noblewoman 
 Ermengol V (or Armengol), count of Urgell (b. 1078)
 Felicia of Sicily, queen of Hungary (approximate date)
 Fujiwara no Kanshi, Japanese empress (b. 1021)
 Giselbert II (or Guislabert), count of Roussillon
 Guglielmo Embriaco, Genoese merchant (b. 1040)
 Hugh VI (the Devil), French nobleman and crusader
 Khön Könchok Gyalpo, Tibetan Buddhist monk (b. 1034)
 Mahmud al-Kashgari, Turkish lexicographer (b. 1005)
 Maurice (or Mauritius), cardinal-bishop of Porto
 Odo I (the Red), duke of Burgundy (b. 1060)
 Odon de Châtillon, cardinal-bishop of Ostia
 Stephen I, count palatine of Burgundy (b. 1065)
 Walter Giffard, 1st Earl of Buckingham
 Xiang, Chinese empress and regent (b. 1047)

References